Summertime's Calling Me is a song written by Johnny Barker, then of the beach music band The Catalinas, in December 1975. Originally released as a 45rpm single on Sugarbush Records, the song initially had slow growth on the beach music scene.  Today, however, it is regarded as one of the most influential and favorite beach music songs of all time (ranging between #s 4-7 depending on the source).

References

External links
Summertime's Calling Me on Youtube

1975 singles
1975 songs